{{DISPLAYTITLE:C13H21NO2S}}
The molecular formula C13H21NO2S (molar mass: 255.38 g/mol) may refer to:

 2C-T-4
 2C-T-7
 Thioproscaline
 Thiosymbescaline
 Tiprenolol

Molecular formulas